Quwat al-Shaheed al-Sadr, translated as the Army of Martyr Sadr, is an Iraqi militia. They are officially known as the 25th Brigade of the Popular Mobilization Forces. It is the military wing of the Islamic Dawa Party, which is led by Nouri al-Maliki.

References

Islamic Dawa Party
Shia Islamist groups
Anti-ISIL factions in Iraq
Popular Mobilization Forces
Rebel groups in Iraq